Jeff & Some Aliens is an American adult animated sitcom created by Sean Donnelly and Alessandro Minoli. It is based on sketches from TripTank. The series stars Brett Gelman and Alessandro Minoli. The series aired on Comedy Central from January 11, 2017, to March 15, 2017.

The plot surrounds three aliens who travel to Earth to find the most average person to test and understand humans. Most episodes revolve around Jeff having a problem that the aliens can fix with a strange device.

On December 1, 2017, the series was canceled after one season.

Cast
Brett Gelman as Jeff Mahoney
Alessandro Minoli as Jimmy / Ted / Sammy
Jon Daly as Chet
Josh Fadem as Dave
Marc Evan Jackson as Zoops
Mark Ivanir as Evgeny
Alicia Silverstone as Alison, Jeff's Sister
Zack Pearlman as Corey
Helena Mattsson as Inga  
Tress MacNeille as Pam, Jeff's Mom
Richard Kind as Stanley, Jeff's Dad
Natalie Smyka as Linda
Hannah Heller as Sally 
Kesha as Znorla

Episodes

References

External links
 

2017 American television series debuts
2017 American television series endings
2010s American adult animated television series
2010s American comic science fiction television series
2010s American sitcoms
American adult animated comedy television series
American adult animated science fiction television series
American comic science fiction television series
American adult animated television spin-offs
American animated sitcoms
English-language television shows
Comedy Central original programming
Comedy Central animated television series
Animated television series about extraterrestrial life